EN 50436 is a series of European standards for ignition interlock devices (Syn.: Alcohol interlock called).

An alcohol interlock consists basically of an instrument measuring breath alcohol and a vehicle immobilizer. The installation is possible in different types of vehicles like passenger cars, buses, transporters, motorcycles or trains. A breath sample has to be delivered to the alcohol interlock before the vehicle motor can be started or the vehicle can be moved. The alcohol interlock will prevent the driver to start the  motor if he/she has an alcohol concentration above a predetermined limit value.

An alcohol interlock consists of two main components: the breath alcohol measuring instrument with the measuring system and a mouthpiece located in the interior of the vehicle,  and the control unit normally installed under the dashboard and unblocking, resp. blocking the current supply to the starter relay of the vehicle.

There are several areas in which alcohol interlocks may be used:
 installed in a vehicle as a general preventive measure for the promotion of traffic safety, on a voluntary basis or legally required in certain vehicles (for example vehicles for children transport), or
 in vehicles as ordered by a court or an administrative authority as part of a drink-driving offender programme, or
 for persons subject to a medical or rehabilitation programme.

Standard series EN 50436 
The series of European Standards EN 50436 „Alcohol interlocks - Test methods and performance requirements“ are developed since the year 2013 by the committee BTTF 116-2 „Alcohol interlocks“ of the European Committee for Electrotechnical Standardization (CENELEC). The members have been nominated by the national standardisation organisations of numerous European countries. They represent ministries, road traffic authorities, road safety organisations, labour unions, testing laboratories as well as manufacturers of alcohol interlocks and vehicles. The secretariat of the committee is organized by Deutsche Kommission Elektrotechnik Elektronik Informationstechnik im DIN und VDE (DKE).

The committee has under the chairmanship of Dr.habil Johannes Lagois  and since 2016 of Dr. Stefan Morley developed the series EN 50436 of European Standards. The compliance with these standards is in the meantime required in laws and regulations of several European countries as technical requirement for the use of alcohol interlocks.

The series EN 50436 specifies the test procedures and basic performance requirements for alcohol interlocks and gives guidance to authorities, decision makers, purchasers and users. Additionally, it describes the requirements for vehicles for the installation alcohol interlocks.

The standards may be bought through the national standardisation organisations being members of the European Committee for Electrotechnical Standardization (CENELEC) in the three language versions English,  German,  and French.

EN 50436-1 
„Alcohol interlocks - Test methods and performance requirements - Part 1: Instruments for drink-driving-offender programs“
 1st edition: November 2005
 Corrigendum to 1st edition: June 2009 (French title changed)
 2nd edition: January 2014

This European Standard specifies test methods and performance requirements for breath alcohol controlled alcohol interlocks. It covers alcohol interlocks intended to be used in programmes for drink driving offenders as well as in programmes monitored or controlled in a comparable way.

This European Standard also applies to alcohol interlocks integrated into other control systems of the vehicle as well as to accessory devices connected to the alcohol interlock.

This European Standard is directed with its technical details mainly at test laboratories and manufacturers of alcohol interlocks. It defines requirements and test procedures for type testing.

The most important very comprehensive tests and requirements described in this standard are:
 measurement accuracy of the alcohol concentration, 
 environmental tests with different ambient temperatures and humidity, 
 tests of time to be ready, 
 durability tests with vibrations and dropping, 
 measures against circumvention and manipulation, 
 influence of other exhaled gases than alcohol, 
 long term behaviour, 
 electrical tests for supply voltage and durability against short-circuits, 
 electromagnetic compatibility and electrical disturbances, 
 content of the instructions for installation and use.

The 2nd edition has been basically revised compared to the 1st edition, the amount of the tests considerably extended and the requirements tightened.

The 2nd edition includes now also accessory devices of the alcohol interlock authorised by the manufacturer as being part of the alcohol interlock system and which are intended to be used in the vehicle during operation. These are for example cameras or GPS systems generating data related to event data of the alcohol interlock, as well as accessory devices handling or transferring data for a drink-driving-offender programme.

The content and requirements are based on the experience and necessities of drink driving offender programmes in different countries over several decades. Therefore, alcohol interlocks used in programmes for drink driving offenders programmes should be tested according to this European Standard and fulfil its requirements.

EN 50436-2 
EN 50436-2: Alcohol interlocks - Test methods and performance requirements - Part 2:  Instruments having a mouthpiece and measuring breath alcohol for general preventive use

 1st edition: December 2007
 Corrigendum to 1st edition: June 2009 (French title changed)
 2nd edition: January 2014
 Amendment A1 to 2nd edition: March 2015

This European Standard specifies test methods and performance requirements for breath alcohol controlled alcohol interlocks intended for general preventive use.

This European Standard also applies to alcohol interlocks integrated into other control systems of the vehicle as well as to accessory devices connected to the alcohol interlock.

This European Standard is directed with its technical details mainly at test laboratories and manufacturers of alcohol interlocks. It defines requirements and test procedures for type testing.

The 2nd edition has been basically revised compared to the 1st edition, the amount of the tests is considerably extended and the requirements are tightened. In the 2nd edition of EN 50436-2 now is EN 50436-1 the basic standard and the text of part 2 describes only the differences in the requirements compared to part 1.

The most important differences of the tests and requirements of part 2 compared to part 1 are the following:
 the required temperature range within which the alcohol interlock has to perform and measure properly is -20 °C to 70 °C (instead of -40 °C to 85 °C);
 the requirement for the measurement accuracy at high alcohol concentrations (from 0.75 mg/L) is reduced;
 the provision of a data memory is optional.

In the amendment A1 it is defined more precisely than in the original 2nd edition which connectable accessory devices of the alcohol interlock have to be tested.

EN 50436-3 
„EN 50436-3: Alcohol interlocks - Test methods and performance requirements - Part 3: Guidance for authorities, decision makers, purchasers and users“

 1st edition: July 2010, published as Technical Report CLC/TR 50436-3
 2nd edition: December 2016

This guidance for authorities, governments, political decision makers, transport companies, purchasers, unions and users contains numerous recommendations for those interested in the use of alcohol interlocks. However, it is not mandatory and it does not contain any requirements.

The purpose of this European Standard is in the series of European Standards for alcohol interlocks is to guide in selection, installation, use and maintenance of alcohol interlocks. It is directed to persons being interested in alcohol interlocks, to companies selling and installing alcohol interlocks, and to purchasers and users. The European Standard informs about the alcohol interlock and its use.

This European Standard describes alcohol interlocks used as a general preventive measure in traffic safety as well as in drink driving offender programmes.

The 2nd edition has been basically revised compared to the 1st edition. Besides the use of alcohol interlocks as a preventive measure,  the use in drink driving offender programmes is addressed more in detail, for example with the description of the basic steps of such a programme. Additionally, the 2nd edition contains a compilation of typical parameter settings of the instruments.

EN 50436-4 
„EN 50436-4: Alcohol interlocks - Test methods and performance requirements - Part 4: Connection between the alcohol interlock and the vehicle“

 1st edition: March 2007 published as draft  prEN 50436-4, project afterwards stopped
 New draft under preparation: since October 2014

This European Standard will specify the standardised interface between an alcohol interlock for aftermarket installation and a vehicle. It details the types of the connectors, the assignment of the connector pins as well as the digital information to be exchanged between the vehicle and the alcohol interlock via a LIN data bus.

This European Standard is applicable to alcohol interlocks for drink-driving-offender programs (as in EN 50436-1) as well as to alcohol interlocks for general preventive use (as in EN 50436-2).

This European Standard is mostly intended for vehicle manufacturers and manufacturers of alcohol interlocks.

The published draft of the  1st edition was based on the state of the technology at that time. However, it has been foreseen that a data bus interface will become the much better solution in the future. This caused that the project has been stopped at this time. In the year 2014 it has been restarted together with the development of part 7. Part 4 will then describe the details of such a data bus interface.

EN 50436-5 
„EN 50436-5: Alcohol interlocks - Test methods and performance requirements - Part 5: Instruments measuring breath alcohol for general preventive use, not having a mouthpiece and compensating by carbon dioxide measurement"

 No draft published, project stopped

This European Standard was intended to specify additional test  procedures and requirements for alcohol interlocks which may be used without an (exchangeable) mouthpiece.

With such an instrument the driver has to blow against a sampling area at the surface of the alcohol interlock. However, in doing so the (eventually alcohol containing) breath air is diluted by mixing with ambient air. To determine the actual breath alcohol concentration, techniques are necessary for compensation of the dilution. The dilution may be determined for example by simultaneous measurement of the carbon dioxide concentration.

During the discussion of the draft of the European Standard, however, it pointed out that the content of carbon dioxide in the exhaled breath air may vary so strongly depending on the physiological condition of the driver that with the actually applicable techniques the determination of the breath alcohol concentration  is not possible with the accuracy necessary for the application in an alcohol interlock.

EN 50436-6 
„EN 50436-6: Alcohol interlocks - Test methods and performance requirements - Part 6: Data security"

 1st edition: March 2015

This European Standard specifies additional security requirements for the protection and handling of event records which are stored in the data memory of alcohol interlocks and which may be downloaded, processed and transferred to supervising persons or organizations.

Optional accessory devices of the alcohol interlock (e.g. cameras or GPS systems) generating data related to event data of the alcohol interlock, as well as accessory devices handling or transferring data for a drink-driving-offender programme come also under this standard.

This European Standard is a supplement to EN 50436-1 and EN 50436-2. It is to be decided by the respective jurisdiction or a vehicle fleet operator whether the standard has to be applied in addition to EN 50436-1, resp. EN 50436-2.

This European Standard is mainly directed to test houses, manufacturers of alcohol interlocks, legislating authorities and organizations which handle and use the alcohol interlock event records.

The standard has been developed on the basis of the Dutch „Protection Profile"  for alcohol interlocks which is listed under the "Common Criteria for Information Technology Security Evaluation“.

EN 50436-7 
„EN 50436-7: Alcohol interlocks - Test methods and performance requirements - Part 7: Installation document"

 1st edition:  December 2016,

Alcohol interlocks are often intended for aftermarket installation. For this purpose, they are connected to the electric and control circuits of the vehicle. This installation of an alcohol interlock should not interfere with the proper performance of the vehicle, should not impair the safety and security of the vehicle, and should be as straightforward as possible. Additionally, the installation costs should be low in relation to the total cost of the alcohol interlock.

Therefore, it is desirable to have a standardized installation document designed by the vehicle manufacturer  to give the necessary details to the technicians installing an alcohol interlock into a certain vehicle model.

This European Standard defines the content and the layout of such an installation document. It details the type of the vehicle, connection schematics, accessibility instructions and recommendations to avoid safety risks.

This European Standard is applicable to alcohol interlocks for drink-driving-offender programs (as in EN 50436-1) as well as to alcohol interlocks for general preventive use (as in EN 50436-2).

This European Standard is mostly intended for vehicle manufacturers and manufacturers of alcohol interlocks.

The technical requirements listed in EN 50436-7 mirror the requirements given in other parts of the series of standards or of standards referenced there. To fulfill EN 50436-7 the documentation as such needs to be compliant to the standard and obviously the necessary functionality needs to be available. The main requirements are listed in Table C.1, where three principal installation options are listed. Vehicle manufacturers are mandated to provide at least one of these options to comply with EN 50436-7. 

 The first option is the classical or traditional way to install an alcohol interlock. Here the voltage supply between the vehicle's ignition switch and the starter system is interrupted. The alcohol interlock is fitted with its output relay into the interrupted starter circuit to enable or disable the start of the motor.
 The second option is a semi-digital connection in which vehicle interfaces to the alcohol interlock through fixed signal lines that are established in the vehicle for this purpose and by this avoids the interruption of any vehicle (starter) lines.
 Finally, EN 50436-7 allows for a digital interface. This is the connection to an internal data bus of the vehicle for information exchange between the vehicle and the alcohol interlock. EN 50436-7 already gives hint to such a digital interface, which is standardised in the fourth part of the series, namely EN 50436-4. This part of the series was first published in February 2019 and is currently extended to also cover the CAN data bus in addition to the LIN data bus.

The specified values, in detail those for current and voltage, that are listed in Table C.1 mirror the minimum requirements for alcohol interlocks according to EN 50436-1 and therefore are mandatory for traditional and semi-digital installations. In those cases where an installation using EN 50436-4 is chosen, the current and voltage requirements of EN 50436-4 apply, because in this case both sides of the interface, the vehicle and the alcohol interlock, shall be certified against EN 50436-4.

The use of EN 50436-4 is not mandated by EN 50436-7. This in principle would make other proprietary solutions of vehicle manufacturers possible. Proprietary solutions obviously shall not contradict the requirements for alcohol interlocks given in the EN 50436 series of standards. However, they need to be fully disclosed and described with their referring test plans in the installation document according to EN 50436-7 and fulfill the current and voltage requirements for the traditional installation.

Hence, as EN 50436-4 provides a standardized digital interface that facilitates the fitting of aftermarket alcohol interlock devices in motor vehicles as well as their factory fitting, it is strongly recommended to choose this interface.

It has been realized in the European Union that the aftermarket installation of an alcohol interlock becomes more and more difficult in modern vehicles and therefore generates a barrier for the use of alcohol interlocks. Therefore, it is planned to bindingly prescribe the preparation of an installation document according EN 50436-7 by the vehicle manufacturer within the framework of the vehicle type approval.

References

50436
Vehicle technology